is a Japanese actress and model under the management of the Ken-On Group. She is best known for her roles in Doramas, including films You're Under Arrest, Omizu no Hanamichi, and Shichinin no Onna Bengoshi.

Career
Hara started appearing in magazines and TV commercials after being scouted as a model in 1996. She made her acting debut one year later in Beach Boys with Takashi Sorimachi. She took on various supporting roles before winning the lead role in the 2000 NTV drama, Cinderella wa Nemuranai.

Hara’s first film role was with Yukie Nakama and Hideaki Itō in the 2001 film Love Song. In the same year, she appeared with Yūko Takeuchi and SMAP leader Masahiro Nakai in the TV medical drama, Shiroi Kage.

In 2002, she had to learn sign language to prepare for her role as a deaf-mute in Shiawase no Shippo. Hara was then cast as Miyuki Kobayakawa in the live action version of You're Under Arrest. In 2005 she was cast alongside Yūki Amami and Mirai Shida in the dark grade school drama, Jyoou no Kyoushitsu.

In 2005 alone, she appeared in five films, including Hinokio and Semishigure. She made her first voice acting performance in the critically acclaimed Japanese animated film, Toki wo Kakeru Shoujo in 2006.

On April 25, 2007, NHK announced that Hara would be part of its 77th Asadora, Chiritotechin. Hara’s role as freelance writer Natsuko Ogata in Chiritotechin was her first in a morning drama, and her longest, as the series ran for 151 episodes from October 1, 2007 to March 29, 2008.

She often works with Kazushige Nagashima, Zaizen Naomi, Emi Wakui, Hideaki Itō, Yōko Nogiwa, and Yumiko Shaku, and is often cast as a teacher, lawyer, or nurse.

She usually appears in TV dramas and specials, variety shows and cultural events. She also remains active as  endorser. Aside from co-starring with Hiroshi Abe in Sekisuiheim commercials, she is also doing promotional work for energy drink Lipovitan Fine (with Shun Oguri).

Filmography

Movies

TV Shows

Endorsements
Lipovitan Fine
Sekisuiheim
Suntory
Brother printers

References

External links
Official Homepage

JMDb Profile

1978 births
Living people
People from Fukuoka
Japanese actresses
Japanese female models
Ken-On artists